Marie of Prussia (23 January 1579 – 21 February 1649) was a Prussian duchess by birth and Margravine of Brandenburg-Bayreuth by marriage.

Life 
Born in Königsberg, Marie was the second daughter of Duke Albert Frederick of Prussia (1553–1618) from his marriage to Marie Eleonore of Cleves (1550–1608), daughter of Duke William the Rich of Jülich-Cleves-Berg.  The princess grew up with her sisters in Königsberg Castle.

On 29 April 1604 she married Margrave Christian of Brandenburg-Bayreuth (1581–1655) in Plassenburg Castle.  Since her father left no male heirs, a dispute arose between Prussia and Jülich-Cleves-Berg about Mary's compensation.  In 1613, Marie acquired the manors of Schreez and Culmbach in Haag (Oberfranken).  She used the income from these manors to expand Unternschreez Castle, her Wittum.  Mary and her family in Franconia had to flee their homes during the Thirty Years' War, and the manors were lost.

Marie died in 1649 and was buried in the City Church in Bayreuth; she had donated the high altar in this church.

Offspring 
From her marriage, Marie had the following children:
 Margravine Elisabeth Eleonore of Brandenburg-Bayreuth (born and died 1606)
 Margrave George Frederick of Brandenburg-Bayreuth (born and died 1608)
 Margravine Anna Maria of Brandenburg-Bayreuth (1609–1680); married in 1639 Prince Johann Anton I von Eggenberg (1610-1649)
 Margravine Magdalene Sibylle of Brandenburg-Bayreuth (1612–1687); married in 1638 John George II of Saxony (1613-1680)
 Margravine Agnes Sophie of Brandenburg-Bayreuth (born and died 1611)
 Margrave Christian Ernest of Brandenburg-Bayreuth (1613–1614)
 Erdmann August (1615–1651), Hereditary Prince of Brandenburg-Bayreuth; married in 1641 princess Sophie of Brandenburg-Ansbach (1614-1646)
 Georg Albrecht (1619–1666), (not ruling) Margrave of Brandenburg-Kulmbach (junior line); married firstly in 1651 Princess Marie Elisabeth of Holstein-Sonderburg-Glücksburg (1628-1664). Married secondly in 1665 Countess Marie Sophie of Solms-Baruth (1626-1688)
 Margrave Frederick William of Brandenburg-Bayreuth (born and died 1620)

|-

References 
 Julius Mebes: Contributions to the history of Brandenburg-Prussian state and army, Lüderitz, 1861, p. 863

Footnotes 

House of Hohenzollern
1579 births
1649 deaths
Margravines of Brandenburg-Bayreuth
Nobility from Königsberg
Daughters of monarchs